Brandon Miller may refer to:

Sports
Brandon Miller (American football) (born 1986), American football defensive end
Brandon Miller (basketball, born 1979), American basketball coach and former player
Brandon Miller (basketball, born 2002), American basketball player
Brandon Miller (lacrosse) (born 1979), Canadian lacrosse goaltender
Brandon Miller (racing driver) (born 1981), American auto racing driver
Brandon Miller (runner) (born 2003), American athlete
Brandon Miller (soccer) (born 1989), American soccer goalkeeper
Brandon Nozaki Miller, American motorcyclist and software developer

Others
Brandon Miller (musician) (born 1990), American singer-songwriter
Brandon Nozaki Miller, American software developer and motorcyclist

See also
Branden Miller, actor and comedian
Brendon Miller, American pornographic actor